Castello Cabiaglio is a comune (municipality) in the Province of Varese in the Italian region Lombardy, located about  northwest of Milan.

Castello Cabiaglio borders the following municipalities: Barasso, Brinzio, Comerio, Cuveglio, Cuvio, Luvinate, Rancio Valcuvia, Varese.

Demographic evolution

References

Cities and towns in Lombardy